Uzwil railway station is a railway station in Uzwil, in the Swiss canton of St. Gallen. It is an intermediate station on the St. Gallen–Winterthur line.

Services 
 Uzwil is served by two long-distance SBB services, both of which run hourly and operate over the St. Gallen–Winterthur line, combining for half-hourly service between Zürich and St. Gallen:

References

External links 
 
 

Railway stations in the canton of St. Gallen
Swiss Federal Railways stations
Uzwil